Sankey tank (Kannada:ಸ್ಯಾಂಕಿ ಕೆರೆ), a manmade lake or tank, is situated in the western part of Bangalore in the middle of the neighbourhoods of Malleshwaram, Vyalikaval and Sadashivanagar.

Sankey tank was constructed by Col. Richard Hieram Sankey (RE) of the Madras Sappers Regiment, in 1882, to meet the water supply demands of Bangalore. The tank was also known as Gandhadhakotikere, as the Government Sandalwood Depot used to be located near the lake.

History
Sankey reservoir was constructed in 1882. It was linked to the Miller's tank and Dharmambudhi tank and was built as a safeguard against water shortages, such as that experienced in the Great Famine of 1876–78. The quality of water was not very good and when  Governor of Madras visited Bangalore on July 1888. A local wit commented, "The men who are thrown off their horses and killed on the spot at Bangalore are the only ones that are allowed by doctors not to have died from drinking bad water".

Threats
The threats posed to the survival of the lake, which were also identified by the local people (morning joggers) using the lake, refer to:
 Contamination of water with sewage flowing in from seven points, which are connected to storm water drains
 Choked drains with garbage and sewage
 Leaking sewage pipes connected to a public toilet at a park
 Decrease in the biological oxygen demand and high BOD content due to sewage
 Threats to fish and plants. During the tests conducted in 2001 also the DO was reported to vary from 3.7 to 8.1, BOD between 2 and 8 and the pH varied from 7.1 to 7.5.
 Reduction number of ducks, fish and migratory birds due to polluted condition of the lake waters

Restoration actions

The tank was converted into a park by the Bangalore Water Supply and Sewerage Board (BWSSB) and the Bangalore Mahanagara Palike (BMP) with funds provided by the Government of Karnataka. In addition, the following were also implemented.
 Removing encroachments
 Alum purification treatment to absorb toxic elements and germs
 Nursery towards the north
 Paved walkways
 Landscaped parks
 Special tank for idol immersion during Ganesh Chaturthi festival
 Restoration of swimming pool

Legal land encroachment tangle
In 2004, local builders’ proposal to construct a multistory building in the Sankey tank bed was challenged by petitioners in the Karnataka Lok Adalat (Peoples Court, an adjunct of the High Court). But the Court was informed by the Bangalore Mahanagar Palike (BMP) that it had not sanctioned any plan for the proposed building and that it would take immediate action to prevent any such steps by the developer taken without a no-objection certificate from the Ministry of Environment and Forests.

The Lok Adalat ordered the Forest Department to repossess  of land belonging to it from the real estate developers who had set out to build an apartment block there. The Karnataka State Pollution Control Board (KSPCB) informed the court that the proposal of Abhishek Builders and Mantri Developers to build an 18–floor luxury apartment block near the Sankey Tank has been turned down as gross violations were noted under the Air (Prevention and Control of Pollution) Act and the Water (Prevention and Control of Pollution) Act.

See also 
 Lakes in Bangalore

References

Further reading 

 

Lakes of Bangalore
Reservoirs in Karnataka
Buildings and structures in Bangalore
Buildings and structures designed by Richard Hieram Sankey